Thamir Muhsin (1938–1995) was a senior lecturer at the Baghdad University, and a respected football coach in the Iraqi top division having managed at Al-Jamiea and the Iraq. He was born, and died, in Baghdad.

The trainer worked closely with former Al-Maslaha teammate Wathiq Naji with the Iraqi youth team and spent time at the prestigious German Deutsche Hochschule fur Korperkultur (German College for Body Culture: D.H.f.K.) in Leipzig.

The coach managed Al-Quwa Al-Jawiya, Al-Sinaa and Al-Shurta and the Iraq youth team during his coaching career.

References

People from Baghdad
1938 births
1995 deaths
Iraqi football managers
Iraq national football team managers
Al-Shorta SC managers